Genie High (ジェニーハイ) is a Japanese progressive indie band, notably fronted by Enon Kawatani (川谷 健太) of Gesu no Kiwami Otome (ゲスの極み乙女) and Ikkyu Nakajima (中嶋 イッキュウ) of Tricot (トリコ).

Biography 

The band was formed after Nakajima, Niigaki, and Kukki appeared regularly on the talk-show Bazooka!!!, hosted by Koyabu. The show was run as an experiment aimed at garnering attention from the press.  Spelt out in katakana, the name means "transcending genius".

Since their debut, MV was released on March 15, 2018 they have gone on to release one EP and two albums, which have each enjoyed some chart success. The self-tilted EP Genie High (ジェニーハイ) debuted at number 3 on the Billboard Japan "Hot Albums" chart. This was followed by the full-length release Genie High Story (ジェニーハイストーリー) in November 2019, which debuted at number 18. Then in September 2021, the band's second full-length album Genie Star (ジェニースター) debuted at number 8.

Despite the band reportedly finding it difficult to find time to perform due to their other commitments, they recorded the live performance Arena Genie (アリーナジェニー) released on DVD in January 2022.

References 

Japanese pop music groups
2018 establishments in Japan
Musical groups established in 2018
Musical groups from Tokyo